The 1995–96 West Midlands (Regional) League season was the 96th in the history of the West Midlands (Regional) League, an English association football competition for semi-professional and amateur teams based in the West Midlands county, Shropshire, Herefordshire, Worcestershire and southern Staffordshire.

Premier Division

The Premier Division featured 16 clubs which competed in the division last season, along with three new clubs:
Brierley Hill Town, relegated from the Midland Football Alliance
Lichfield City, promoted from Division One
Wolverhampton Casuals, promoted from Division One

League table

References

External links

1995–96
9